The Embassy of the United States of America in the Manila is the diplomatic mission of the United States in the Philippines. It is situated at  Roxas Boulevard in Ermita, Manila.  he Embassy has been representing the United States Government since the Philippines was granted independence on July 4, 1946.

The Manila mission is one of the US Department of State's largest posts, employing close to 300 Americans and 1,000 Foreign Service national employees.  The mission also hosts the only foreign office of the Department of Veterans Affairs, which caters to some 18,000 American and Filipino veterans and their widows in the Philippines (see also Filipino Veterans Fairness Act.)

Manila's Regional Printing Center provides printing and distribution services for overseas and domestic publications.  Smaller branches exist in Vienna, Austria and Washington, D.C. but Manila is the flagship facility.

History
The chancery of the Embassy in Manila was first constructed to house the United States High Commission to the Philippines and was designed by the US Treasury Department, Procurement Division, Public Buildings Branch after considering and later rejecting a design by the notable Filipino architect Juan M. Arellano.  The building is built on reclaimed land that was a gift from the Government of the Philippines and sits on more than 600 reinforced concrete piles that were sunk 60 feet into the site.  The site was originally designed as a demesne along Manila Bay, which featured a revival-style mansion that took advantage of the seaside vista.  It was insisted, though, that a federal-style building be built. The chancery was completed in 1940.

During World War II, after the Fall of Bataan, the property became the residence of the Commander-in-Chief of the Imperial Japanese Army in the Philippines.  When the Japanese-sponsored Puppet Republic was established in 1943, the building was repainted and refurbished and served as the Embassy of Japan to the Philippines.  During its recapture by Allied forces and Philippine guerrillas, the building was seriously damaged but its ballroom, among other rooms, remained intact.

In October 1945, quonset huts were erected throughout the property and became known as The Courthouse, the center of the Japanese war crimes trial in the Philippines, with the ballroom serving as the courtroom and the upstairs rooms serving as holding cells.

On July 4, 1946, the Philippines was granted independence by the United States and the building became known as the United States Embassy in Manila.

As a testament to its battle-scarred history, its flagpole was never restored and still retains the bulletholes it sustained during the war.  The chancery has also been designated as historic property by the National Historical Institute of the Philippines as well as being on the United States Secretary of State's register of culturally significant places.

Embassy sections

The Embassy exercises a number of functions in its representation the Government of the Philippines, including political, administrative, economic, public diplomacy, and consular affairs, that are managed under the Ambassador by counselors from the U.S. Department of State.

For bilateral development projects, the managing office is the United States Agency for International Development, while military affairs are managed by Defense Attaché and the Joint U.S. Military Assistance Group in the Philippines.  The Veterans Administration also has its only overseas office, and outpatient clinic, at the Embassy in Manila.

Consular Section
American Citizen Services
Visa Services
Economic Section
Defense Attaché
Public Affairs
Political Section
Management Section
Other U.S. Government Agencies
U.S. Agency for International Development
U.S. Ambassador to the Asian Development Bank
U.S. Foreign Agricultural Services
U.S. Commercial Service
U.S. Peace Corps-Philippines
Regional Printing Center-Manila
Social Security Administration
U.S. Department of Veterans Affairs
International Broadcasting Bureau
Joint U.S. Military Assistance Group
Foreign Commercial Service Liaison Office to the Asian Development Bank
U.S. Citizen and Immigration Services

There is also an American Consular Agent in Cebu as well as a virtual consulate in Davao City.

Staff 
MaryKay Carlson is the current United States Ambassador to the Philippines. Senior American diplomat Heather Variava had assumed the role of chargé d’affaires at the United States Embassy in Manila, succeeding John Law who ended his tour of duty in the Philippines this September.

See also 
 The American Residence at Baguio
 Embassy of the Philippines in Washington, D.C.

References

  Alcazaren, Paulo (12 November 2005), "Juan M de Guzman Arellano : Renaissance Man", The Philippine Star.
 THE SECRETARY OF STATE’S REGISTER OF CULTURALLY SIGNIFICANT PROPERTY
  Ricciardone, C. (October 2002), "Post of the Month: Manila", State Magazine.

External links
Embassy of the United States in Manila website

Manila
United States
Buildings and structures in Ermita
Register of Culturally Significant Property
Philippines–United States relations
Juan M. Arellano buildings